Varma may refer to:
 Varma (surname)
 Varma (icebreaker), a Latvian ship
 Adithya Varma, a 2019 Tamil-language drama film
 Varma Mutual Pension Insurance Company, a Finnish company (Finnish: Keskinäinen työeläkevakuutusyhtiö Varma)